The Untitled Deerhoof EP is an MP3 EP by the band Deerhoof, which was self-released in 2006.

Track listing
All songs written by Deerhoof, unless otherwise noted.
"The Continuing Story of Bungalow Bill" (The Beatles cover) (John Lennon, Paul McCartney) – 2:07
"Desaparaceré" (Live) – 3:27
"Wrong Time Capsule" (Live) – 3:25
"Goin' Up the Country" (Canned Heat cover) (Alan Wilson, Henry Thomas) – 2:41
"Spirit Ditties of No Tone" (Live) – 2:28
"Lose My Breath" (My Bloody Valentine cover) (Kevin Shields, Bilinda Butcher) – 3:40
"Dinner for Two" (Live) – 1:09
"Scream Team"/"Lightning Rod, Run" (Live) – 2:24
"There's a Kind of Hush" (Herman's Hermits cover) (Les Reed, Geoff Stephens) – 1:17

Personnel
 Chris Cohen – guitar
 John Dieterich – guitar
 Satomi Matsuzaki – bass guitar and vocals
 Greg Saunier – drums and vocals

References

External links
Untitled E.P. on Kill Rock Stars website

2006 EPs
Deerhoof albums